Evelyn Jane Brendan "Evie" Williams (1929–2012), was a British figurative artist. In her obituary in The Guardian, it was said that her work, "combined vision, dream and reality", and that she had said her art was "inner thoughts, other worlds".

Early life
She was born on 21 January 1929 at 63 Leigham Court Road, Streatham, London, the younger daughter of Brendan Bernard Williams (1904–1986), a journalist and writer, and his wife, Jennie Maude Williams, née Jones (1905–1983), an opera singer. She was educated at Summerhill School, as recommended to her father by his friend Bertrand Russell, and then trained at Saint Martin's School of Art in London, and the Royal College of Art.

Career
In 1950, one of her portraits of children won an Observer prize, and Hugh Casson became a supporter of her work.

In 1973, a career retrospective was held at the Whitechapel Gallery.

Williams' work is held in the public collections of the Victoria and Albert Museum, the Arts Council Collection, Sheffield's Graves Art Gallery, the collection of the Contemporary Art Society for Wales and Amgueddfa Cymru – National Museum Wales.

Personal life
On 28 December 1949, she married a fellow RCA student, the artist Michael Fussell (1927–1974), and they had a daughter, Emma Fussell, born in 1956. In 1963, the marriage was dissolved.

On 26 October 1963 she married, (Richard) Anthony Perry (born 1928), a film producer and charity director, and they had one daughter, Sarah, born in 1964.

Later life
She died on 14 November 2012, of chronic obstructive pulmonary disease, at her home, 12 Finsbury Park Road, London, and was survived by her husband, Anthony, and her two daughters.

References

1929 births
2012 deaths
British women artists
Alumni of Saint Martin's School of Art
Alumni of the Royal College of Art
People educated at Summerhill School